Oh Seung-Lip (born 6 October 1946) is a Korean former judoka who competed in the 1972 Summer Olympics. He won a bronze medal at the 1969 World Judo Championships.

References

1946 births
Living people
Olympic judoka of South Korea
Judoka at the 1972 Summer Olympics
Olympic silver medalists for South Korea
Olympic medalists in judo
South Korean male judoka
Medalists at the 1972 Summer Olympics
Universiade medalists in judo
Universiade silver medalists for South Korea
Medalists at the 1967 Summer Universiade